He's the King and His Band is the first album by Al Hirt to be released by RCA Victor.  The album was recorded at RCA Victor's Studio A in New York City.

The album reached No. 61 on the Billboard Top LPs chart in 1961.

Track listing 
 "I Love Paris" (Cole Porter)
 "One O'Clock Jump" (Count Basie)
 "The Jitterbug Waltz" (Fats Waller)
 "Jazz Me Blues" (Tom Delaney)
 "The King's Blues" (Gerard Purcell)
 "Cornet Chow Suey" (Louis Armstrong)
 "The Old Folks At Home" (Stephen Foster)
 "Lover Come Back To Me" (Sigmund Romberg, Oscar Hammerstein II)
 "Christopher Columbus" (Leon Berry, Andy Razaf)
 "Laura" (David Raksin, Johnny Mercer)
 "Down by the Riverside" (Traditional)
 "Three Little Words" (Harry Ruby, Bert Kalmar)

Chart positions

References

1961 albums
Al Hirt albums
Albums produced by Steve Sholes
RCA Records albums